Scottlethorpe is a village in the South Kesteven district of Lincolnshire, England. The village is within the civil parish of Edenham; the local area is part of the Grimsthorpe Castle estate.

The modern settlement is a series of cottages and a small terrace of houses extending along Scottlethorpe Lane between the modern village of Edenham and the site of the medieval chapel.

Scottlethorpe is mentioned in the Domesday Book as "Scachertorp" within the Beltisloe wapentake, and consisting of 3 households and 1.3 ploughlands. In 1086 the Lord of the Manor and Tenant-in-chief became Robert of Tosny.

There were medieval chapels in the area, one at Scottlethorpe, and others wider afield. The remains of the 12th-century chapel at Scottlethorpe survived as part of a barn at Manor Farm. However, the barn doorway might have come not from the chapel, but from Vaudey Abbey, The doorway was moved into Edenham church in 1967.

References

External links

Villages in Lincolnshire
South Kesteven District